The 2019–20 season is Arsenal de Sarandí's 1st season back in the top division of Argentine football, after promotion from Primera B Nacional. In addition to the Primera División, the club are competing in the Copa Argentina and Copa de la Superliga.

The season generally covers the period from 1 July 2019 to 30 June 2020.

Review

Pre-season
Ramiro López and Sebastián Lomonaco were the first players revealed to be leaving Arsenal de Sarandí at the start of 2019–20, as they agreed moves in June 2019 to Barracas Central and Godoy Cruz respectively. On 13 June, the club announced that Mauricio Aquino's contract would not be renewed; he soon went to Colegiales. A day later, Arsenal completed their first signing after agreeing terms with Lucas Piovi, who would join from Almagro. Juan Cruz Kaprof (Atlético Tucumán) and Ezequiel Rescaldani (Patronato) joined on 21 June. Daniel Sappa, a 'keeper from Estudiantes (LP), was loaned on 24 June; a clause, which would allow him to return to them after six months, was inserted. 24 June also saw Lautaro Parisi loaned from Primera B Nacional's Guillermo Brown.

Loaned players returned home on 30 June. On 1 July, having trained with the team, Nicolás Giménez (Talleres) and Franco Sbuttoni (Atlético Tucumán) signed for Arsenal. A planned pre-season friendly with Racing Club was cancelled on 2 July, with Talleres replacing the Avellaneda club. They met Banfield for their first pre-season match on 3 July, though would lose after conceding three unanswered goals at the Estadio Florencio Sola. A secondary match-up that day ended scoreless. Ryduan Palermo mutually terminated his contract on 4 July. Argentinos Juniors were Arsenal's opponents in friendlies three and four, with both encounters ending in defeats on 6 July in Buenos Aires. Aníbal Leguizamón moved to Ecuadorian Serie A outfit Emelec on 26 June.

Arsenal beat Independiente twice in friendlies on 10 July, after Fernando Torrent and Alan Soñora goals. Arsenal, on 19 July, revealed Pablo Álvarez was training with the club ahead of a potential move from Huracán. Lanús were fought in exhibition matches on 17 July, on a day that saw one win apiece. Unión Santa Fe loaned Federico Milo from Arsenal on 19 July. Arsenal avoided defeat in friendly matches with Rosario Central, drawing and winning at the Estadio Gigante de Arroyito. Pablo Álvarez penned a deal from Huracán on 22 July.

July
Arsenal sealed their return to the top-flight of Argentine football with a 1–0 victory over Banfield on 29 July, as Ezequiel Rescaldani converted a penalty to gain them three points. Two days later, Arsenal held a friendly match with Claypole for players who didn't play against Banfield. They won it 3–0 after goals from Juan Cruz Kaprof, Rubén Zamponi and Juan García.

August
On 1 August, Arsenal revealed that Joel Soñora (Talleres, loan) and Diego Nuñez (San Miguel) were training with the club ahead of potential moves. Both officialized their incomings hours later. Arsenal made it back-to-back wins in the Primera División on 5 August, as they came away from Godoy Cruz's Estadio Malvinas Argentinas with all three points thanks to goals from new signings Nicolás Giménez and Joel Soñora. Arsenal drew and lost to Racing Club in friendlies on 9 August. Arsenal secured nine points from a possible nine in the league on 18 August versus Defensa y Justicia, following strikes by Lautaro Parisi, Gastón Álvarez Suárez and Joel Soñora. Arsenal fell to defeat in a friendly with Atlanta on 19 August, with a back-up line-up losing by three goals at home.

Arsenal's three-match winning streak came to a close on 23 August, as San Lorenzo maintained their own unbeaten run with a 0–2 victory. Arsenal were knocked out of the Copa Argentina on 28 August by Estudiantes (BA), who went three up in thirty minutes.

September
Arsenal were condemned to a 1–0 loss at the hands of Atlético Tucumán on 1 September.

Squad

Transfers
Domestic transfer windows:3 July 2019 to 24 September 201920 January 2020 to 19 February 2020.

Transfers in

Transfers out

Loans in

Loans out

Friendlies

Pre-season
Arsenal de Sarandí announced five pre-season friendlies on 11 June 2019, with the club setting encounters with Banfield, Argentinos Juniors, Independiente, Racing Club and Lanús; to be played between 3 July and 17 July. The cancellation of the Racing Club friendly allowed them to schedule a match with Talleres in its place. However, the Talleres fixture was also cancelled due to bad weather. A game away to Rosario Central was later added.

Mid-season
Arsenal scheduled a friendly with Claypole for 31 July, with it allowing players who didn't feature in their Primera División opener against Banfield two days prior. Arsenal held a fixture on 9 August in their city with Racing Club at Predio Tita Mattiussi; the latter club's training ground. An encounter with Atlanta was also set. They'd take a trip to Vélez Sarsfield on 6 September.

Competitions

Primera División

League table

Relegation table

Source: AFA

Results summary

Matches
The fixtures for the 2019–20 campaign were released on 10 July.

Copa Argentina

Arsenal were paired with Estudiantes (BA) in the Copa Argentina round of thirty-two.

Copa de la Superliga

Squad statistics

Appearances and goals

Statistics accurate as of 1 September 2019.

Goalscorers

Notes

References

Arsenal de Sarandí seasons
Arsenal de Sarandí